Liberty Racing was an American auto racing team co-owned by former Cleveland Cavaliers player Brad Daugherty and owner of Liberty auto Group Jim Herrick. The team ran a single Ford in the NASCAR Craftsman Truck Series between 1997 and 1999. Notable drivers included Kevin Harvick and Kenny Irwin Jr.

History
In 1995, Butch Miller joined the fledgling Craftsman Truck Series, driving the No. 98 Raybestos/Herrick Racing Ford. He continued to run full-time through 1998. Irwin had 2 wins at Homestead-Miami Speedway and Texas Motor Speedway, seven top-5s, and 10 top-10 finishes in 1997, on his way to a 10th-place finish in the final point standings. He also won Rookie of the Year honors that season. The manager in 1997 was Tim Stevens and the mechanic was Dave Carriere.

1998
Wayne Anderson drove the No. 84 car in the 1998 season with Troy Selberg as crew chief.

1999
Kevin Harvick drove the No. 98 car in the 1999 season with Roland Wlodyka as crew chief. Harvick got six top-five finishes.

References

Defunct NASCAR teams